"Someday My Prince Will Come" is a song from Walt Disney's 1937 animated movie Snow White and the Seven Dwarfs.

Someday My Prince Will Come may also refer to:

Music
 Someday My Prince Will Come (Chet Baker album), 1979
 Someday My Prince Will Come (Miles Davis album), 1961
 Someday My Prince Will Come (Wynton Kelly album), 1961
 Someday My Prince Will Come, an album by Alexis Cole, 2009
 "Someday My Prince Will Come", a song by '68 Comeback, 1996

Television
 "Someday My Prince Will Come" (Roseanne), a 1996 episode
 Someday My Prince Will Come, a 2005 documentary by Marc Isaacs